Big Creek Township, Kansas may refer to:

 Big Creek Township, Ellis County, Kansas
 Big Creek Township, Neosho County, Kansas
 Big Creek Township, Russell County, Kansas

See also 
 List of Kansas townships
 Big Creek Township (disambiguation)

Kansas township disambiguation pages